Adam Orleton (died 1345) was an English churchman and royal administrator.

Life
Orleton was born into a Herefordshire family, possibly in Orleton, possibly in Hereford. The lord of the manor was Roger Mortimer, to whose interests Orleton was loyal. His nephews were John Trilleck, Bishop of Hereford and Thomas Trilleck, Bishop of Rochester.

From the accession of Edward II Orleton  was employed as a diplomat to the papal court, at Avignon from 1309, of Clement V and John XXII. A favourite of the latter, Orleton was nominated bishop of Hereford by the pope on 15 May 1317, and consecrated on 22 May 1317, despite the protests of the king. During his episcopate the great central tower at Hereford, a wonder of its day, was built, but there is no reason to think him responsible for a matter under the jurisdiction of the dean and chapter. Despite his increasing political involvement with Queen Isabella and Roger Mortimer against Edward II,  playing a significant role in the events of 1326, Orleton was an effective bishop in Hereford diocese, and reformed the scandalous Wigmore Abbey  and also the priory at Abergavenny and St. Guthlac's priory in Hereford.

Orleton was translated to be bishop of Worcester on 25 September 1327, and lastly to be bishop of Winchester on 1 December 1333. 

British historian Ian Mortimer has recently argued that Orleton's sodomy accusations against Edward II in 1326-1327 may have been false, and that they may have been related to contemporary smear campaigns against one's political adversaries, such as previous similar aspersions cast against Pope Boniface VIII by Guillaume de Nogaret, Chancellor to King Philip IV of France, as well as those involved in dispossession of the Knights Templar, during which Orleton was a primary antagonist of the order 

One assessment stated that:

Bishop Adam, wary, unscrupulous, but at the same time vigorous and of unusual ability, played a great part in politics to the end of the wretched King's life. Some historians still believe that he recommended the murder; he certainly supported the deposition in Parliament, and went to Kenilworth as one of the commissioners to force the King's resignation. If thus interested in secular politics, he was no less watchful and vigilant in the affairs of his bishopric and the cathedral.

In 1327 Orleton briefly held the office of Lord High Treasurer, from January to March.

Orleton died on 18 July 1345.

In literature

In Christopher Marlowe's play Edward II, Orleton is given a role in Edward's death. This traditional story is not given credence by contemporary historians.

Orleton is a supporting character in Les Rois maudits (The Accursed Kings), a series of French historical novels by Maurice Druon.

Notes

Citations

References

 
 Haines, Roy Marti The Church and Politics in Fourteenth-Century England: The Career of Adam Orleton c. 1275–1345 1978
 McKisack, May, The Fourteenth Century
 Weir, Alison Isabella: She-Wolf of France, Queen of England 2005

External links

13th-century births
1345 deaths
Bishops of Hereford
Bishops of Winchester
Bishops of Worcester
14th-century English Roman Catholic bishops
Lord High Treasurers of England
Year of birth unknown